Anastasia Pavlyuchenkova was the defending champion, but she chose not to participate this year.

Ana Ivanovic won her second title of the year, defeating fellow Serbian Jovana Jakšić 6–2, 6–1 in the final, the first (and to date only) all-Serbian final on the WTA tour.

Seeds

Draw

Finals

Top half

Bottom half

Qualifying

Seeds

Qualifiers

Qualifying draw

First qualifier

Second qualifier

Third qualifier

Fourth qualifier

References
Main Draw
Qualifying Draw

Monterrey Open - Singles
2014 Singles